
The neocognitron is a hierarchical, multilayered artificial neural network proposed by Kunihiko Fukushima in 1979. It has been used for Japanese handwritten character recognition and other pattern recognition tasks, and served as the inspiration for convolutional neural networks.

The neocognitron was inspired by the model proposed by Hubel & Wiesel in 1959. They found two types of cells in the visual primary cortex called simple cell and complex cell, and also proposed a cascading model of these two types of cells for use in pattern recognition tasks.

The neocognitron is a natural extension of these cascading models. The neocognitron consists of multiple types of cells, the most important of which are called S-cells and C-cells. The local features are extracted by S-cells, and these features' deformation, such as local shifts, are tolerated by C-cells. Local features in the input are integrated gradually and classified in the higher layers. The idea of local feature integration is found in several other models, such as the Convolutional Neural Network model, the SIFT method, and the HoG method.

There are various kinds of neocognitron. For example, some types of neocognitron can detect multiple patterns in the same input by using backward signals to achieve selective attention.

See also
Artificial neural network
Deep learning
Pattern recognition
Receptive field
Self-organizing map
Unsupervised learning

Notes

References 
 
 
 Kunihiko Fukushima. "A hierarchical neural network model for selective attention." In Eckmiller, R. & Von der Malsburg, C. eds. Neural computers, Springer-Verlag. pp. 81–90. 1987.

External links
Neocognitron on Scholarpedia
NeoCognitron by Ing. Gabriel Minarik - application (C#) and video
Neocognitron resources at Visiome Platform - includes MATLAB environment
Beholder - a Neocognitron simulator

Artificial neural networks